Charles Stewart Slatton (March 13, 1895 – February 23, 1951) was a justice of the Supreme Court of Texas from September 21, 1945 to October 1, 1947.

References

Justices of the Texas Supreme Court
1895 births
1951 deaths
20th-century American judges